Wilston is a northern suburb in the City of Brisbane, Queensland, Australia.

Geography 
It has a mixture of old and new styles of architecture, from workers' cottages to modern architect-designed homes on Wilston Hill.

Wilston is home to many professionals, including many medical professionals, due to its inner city location, proximity to the Royal Brisbane and Women's Hospital and views of the city that are available from more elevated streets.

In recent years, the area has been transformed by the revamping of Kedron Brook Road, an early precursor to the City Council's urban renewal process that was to roll out across much of inner Brisbane. This has seen a vibrant hub of al-fresco dining evolve, which in turn has increased the popularity of the area and led to a significant increase in the cost of housing in recent years.

Residents are also well serviced by public transport (Wilston train station and regular bus routes) and leisure parks and walkways running alongside Enoggera Creek. The area is also close to local sporting grounds such as Downey Park and Ballymore Stadium.

History
The Turrbal clan occupied what is today known as Wilston.

The area became known as Wilston after the home of the same name built there by the Honourable William Wilson MLC, who settled in the district in 1868. The home, which was constructed circa 1876, was named Wilston House after Wilson's birthplace home at Derrykeeghan Mills, Enniskillen, County Fermanagh, Ireland. The family believes it is short for Wilson Town.

In 1884, the land passed to businessman John Stevenson MLA, who subdivided the property.

On Sunday 10 August 1913, a stump-capping ceremony was held for the new Wilston Methodist Church. The official opening was held on Sunday 26 October 1913.

Oakleigh House, at 17 Murray Street, Wilston, has been a landmark for over fifty years. It was occupied, from 1902, by George Murray, a Brisbane police magistrate and postmaster. It is a colonial timber house which still stands proudly preserved today.

In 1905, 29 Murray Street was built for the Zoeller family. The house became a reception centre in June 1948, and was the venue for over 25,000 wedding and other receptions until in 1990, 'Oakleigh' was also converted to a function venue, and both houses operated as such until 1995.

Between 1924 and 1931, estates were created to provide more land for housing development.

The median age of the Wilston population was 35 years, 2 years below the Australian median.  76% of people living in Wilston were born in Australia, compared to the national average of 69.8%; the next most common countries of birth were England 4.5%, New Zealand 3.2%, Italy 1.3%, India 1.1%, South Africa 0.7%.  87.4% of people spoke only English at home; the next most common languages were 1.9% Italian, 0.6% German, 0.6% Cantonese, 0.6% Mandarin, 0.5% Punjabi.

Heritage listings 

Heritage-listed sites in Wilston include:
 Uanda (house), 27 Clifton Street
 Wilston Methodist Memorial Church, 181 Kedron Brook Road
 Wilston State School, Primrose Street (now in Grange)

Education
St Columba's Primary School is a Catholic primary (Prep-6) school for boys and girls at Kedron Brook Road. In 2018, the school had an enrolment of 593 students with 43 teachers (34 full-time equivalent) and 35 non-teaching staff (20 full-time equivalent).

There are no government schools in Wilston. The nearest government primary school is Wilston State School, which, despite its name, is within the neighbouring suburb of Grange to the north. The nearest government secondary school is Kelvin Grove State College in neighbouring Kelvin Grove to the south-west and Kedron State High School in Kedron to the north-east.

Sporting clubs
Sporting clubs in the area include the 100+ year old Grange Thistle Football Club (GTFC, which also incorporates the Grange Bowls Club), Wilston Norths Junior Cricket Club, Wilston Grange Australian Football Club, Fortitude Valley Rugby League Football Club and St Andrews Ladies Hockey Club.

Other clubs include DAT Racing (triathlon), Wilston Crocs (swimming club), and Lococo Tennis.

The nearby Grange Club (Grange Bowls and Community Club Inc.) has represented the suburb in lawn bowls for 70 years.

Retail business
Wilston Village in Kedron Brook Road is the main retail area. Local stores in the area are supplemented by larger centres at HomeZone at Windsor, 

Lutwyche Shopping Centre and slightly further away at Stafford and Brookside.

Transport
Wilston railway station provides access to regular Queensland Rail City network services to Ferny Grove, Brisbane and Beenleigh.

Parks 
There are a number of parks in the suburb, including:

 Eildon Hill Reserve
 Finsbury Park

 Hinkler Park

 Langley Avenue Park

 Ruby Robinson Reserve

 Wilston Place Park

 Wilston Recreation Reserve

Notable residents
James Tolson, a short-term resident of Wilston House, conducted important experiments in chilling mutton for export from Australia to Great Britain.

Major General William Cahill, a commissioner of police in Queensland, also lived at Wilston House for a period. During his residence he further developed the grounds, which became known as a sanctuary for birds and native fauna.

Peter Beattie, the former Premier of Queensland, previously resided in this suburb.

References

External links

 University of Queensland: Queensland Places: Wilston
 
 

Suburbs of the City of Brisbane